Lauren MacColl is a Scottish fiddle player from Fortrose. She has released three solo albums as well as a duet album with flute player Calum Stewart. MacColl is a member of the fiddle quartet RANT and contemporary folk band Salt House.

Discography

Solo albums
When Leaves Fall (2007)
Strewn With Ribbons (2009)
The Seer (2017)
Landskein (2020)

With Heal & Harrow
Heal & Harrow (2022)

With Calum Stewart
Wooden Flute & Fiddle (2012)

With RANT
RANT (2014)
Reverie (2016)
The Portage (2019)

With Salt House
Lay Your Dark Low (2013)
Undersong (2018)
Huam (2020)
Working for Zeus (EP) (2021)

Awards
BBC Radio 2 Young Folk Award 2004
MG Alba Scots Trad Music Awards 2009 - "Instrumentalist of the Year"

References

External links

Living people
Scottish folk musicians
Scottish fiddlers
Scottish music
21st-century violinists
Year of birth missing (living people)